Parliamentary elections were held in French Sudan on 8 March 1959. The result was a victory for the Sudanese Union – African Democratic Rally (US-RDA), which won all 80 seats. Voter turnout was just 32.3%. The following year, French Sudan declared independence as Mali, and was declared a one-party state with the US-RDA as the sole legal party. As a result, these would be the last multi-party elections held in the country until 1992.

Results

References

French Sudan
Elections in Mali
Parliamentary election